The Hong Kong men's national under-18 ice hockey team is the men's national under-18 ice hockey team of Hong Kong. The team is controlled by the Hong Kong Ice Hockey Association, a member of the International Ice Hockey Federation.

History
The Hong Kong men's national under-18 ice hockey team played its first game in 2012 during the 2012 IIHF U18 Challenge Cup of Asia in Abu Dhabi, United Arab Emirates. Prior to the start of the tournament Hong Kong were disqualified and all of their games were declared forfeit due to problems with player eligibility. The team was allowed to play exhibition games during the tournament, however the results of the games did not count towards the standings with the scores being officially recorded as 5–0 wins to all the opposing teams. Hong Kong won all four of their exhibition games against the other teams in the tournament. The largest win was against Malaysia which they won 26–0.

International competitions
2012 IIHF U18 Challenge Cup of Asia. Finish: 5th, officially disqualified

IIHF World U18 Championships

2014: 3rd in Division III Group B
2015: 3rd in Division III Group B
2016: 3rd in Division III Group B
2017: 2nd in Division III Group B

Roster
From the 2012 IIHF U18 Challenge Cup of Asia

References

External links
Hong Kong Ice Hockey Association 

Ice hockey in Hong Kong
National under-18 ice hockey teams
Ice hockey